The Ten Thousand Things (original Dutch: De Tienduizend Dingen, 1955) is a novel by the writer Maria Dermout. The story is a rich tapestry of family life against the exotic, tropical background of the Molucca Islands of Indonesia. Although never explicitly stated, the main setting is probably Ambon Island. The story is structured along geographical themes with four major divisions: the Island itself, the Inner Bay, the Outer Bay, and again the Island. Dermout's omniscient narrator is attempting to make sense of the whole generational saga by carefully reflecting on the wonder of this world while revealing some of the horrible evils that the characters commit. After the publication of the English translation by Hans Koning, Time magazine listed it as one of the best books of 1958.

The title of the book is indirectly derived from the poem Xinxin Ming, which is traditionally (although, according to modern scholarship, probably falsely) attributed to the Third Chinese Chán (Zen) patriarch Sengcan, as quoted by Aldous Huxley in The Perennial Philosophy "When the ten thousand things have been seen in their unity, we return to the beginning and remain where we have always been".

Critical reception
The book received many positive reviews. Time wrote: "In translation the book is an uncommon reading experience, an offbeat narrative that has the timeless tone of legend... The Ten Thousand Things are the fragments that make up life's substance, and to go on living, however maddeningly arranged the fragments may be, is itself a valid action. Spelled out against the rich, colorful background that author Dermout knows so well and handles so effectively, this is an affirmation that emerges with an oddly insistent, compelling effect." Reviewing the 2002 English edition, Publishers Weekly remarked "Dermout beautifully depicts the idyllic setting and handles the darker aspects of the story — ghosts, superstition, even murder — with equal skill."

Translations
The book has been translated into 11 different languages.
Arabic, De tienduizend dingen 2005
Chinese Wanwu you ling 2009
Danish De Titusinde Ting 1959
English The Ten Thousand Things 1958 (2 editions), 1983, 1984, 2002
French Les Dix Mille Choses 1959
German Die zehntausend Dinge 1959
Icelandic Frúin í Litlagardi 1960
Indonesian Taman kate-kate 1975
Italian Le diecimila cose 1959
Spanish Las diez mil cosas 1959, 2006 
 Swedish De tiotusen tingen 1958

References

External links
 New York Review Books by Hans Koning, the English language translator

20th-century Dutch novels
1955 novels
Novels set in Indonesia
Molucca Sea
Family saga novels
Dutch-language novels